The Belgian Cup 2007-08 was the 53rd staging of the Belgian Cup which is the main knock-out football competition in Belgium, won by Anderlecht.

Results

Legend
 * = after extra-time
 D2 = second division
 D3 = third division

Matches

Round 6
Teams from the Jupiler League enter the competition at this stage except for the newly promoted teams. The teams from the Jupiler League are seeded and can't meet each other, except again for the newly promoted teams, Dender EH and KV Mechelen. Apart from the 18 teams directly qualified, 14 other teams had qualified through winning in the fifth round:
 11 from Division 2: Olympic Charleroi, Deinze, Eupen, Hamme, Kortrijk, OH Leuven, KV Oostende, Tienen, Union, KVSK United and Waasland.
 3 from Division 3: Eendracht Aalst, Francs Borains and Wetteren.

The draw was made on August 29, 2007.

Round 7
The draw was made on December 5, 2007.

Quarter-finals
The draw for the quarter finals and semi finals was made on January 15, 2008.

Leg 1

Leg 2

Germinal Beerschot won 6–2 on aggregate.

Gent 5–5 Kortrijk on aggregate. Gent won on away goals.

Anderlecht won 4–1 on aggregate.

Standard won 5–4 on aggregate.

Semi-finals

Leg 1

Leg 2

Gent won 6–2 on aggregate.

Anderlecht won 2–1 on aggregate.

Final

References

See also
Belgian Cup - main article

Belgian Cup seasons
Belgian Cup, 2007-08
2007–08 domestic association football cups